The 67th Filmfare Awards South is an awards event that took place at Bengaluru, India on 9 October 2022. The ceremony recognized and honored the best films and performances from the Telugu, Tamil, Kannada and Malayalam films and music released in between 2020 and 2021, along with special honors for lifetime contributions and few special awards. took place in Bengaluru on 9 October 2022  The event was held at Bangalore International Exhibition Centre.

Winners and nominees

Popular awards

Kannada cinema

Malayalam cinema

Tamil cinema

Telugu cinema

Technical awards

Special awards

Superlatives

Performers

Notes

References

External links 

 Filmfare Official Website
 67th Filmfare Awards South 2022

Filmfare Awards South
2022 Indian film awards